The Menoge is a French river found in the Haute-Savoie department. Its source is near the Col des Moise, and flows through Vallée Verte, into the Arve just before Annemasse.

Its tributaries are: Brevon de Saxel (confluence at Boëge) Le Foron de Fillinges (confluence at Bonne), Ruisseau du Nantet (confluence at Vétraz-Montoux).

Settlements along its length include: Habère-Poche, Habère-Lullin, Villard, Burdignin, Boëge, Saint-André-de-Boëge,  Fillinges, Bonne, Arthaz-Pont-Notre-Dame, Cranves-Sales and Vetraz-Monthoux.

References

Rivers of Haute-Savoie
Rivers of France
Rivers of Auvergne-Rhône-Alpes
Auvergne-Rhône-Alpes region articles needing translation from French Wikipedia